Harry van Gestel (born 12 May 1953) is a Dutch artist and painter living and working in Amsterdam, Netherlands, in his gallery and studio in the city centre. The artist is most known for his large abstract works, which range from 2 x 2 meters up to 3 x 6 meters large. He has lived and created his work around the globe, in places such as Taiwan, Europe, the United States, and South America, before returning to Amsterdam.

His Life Journey 
Harry van Gestel was born in Reusel. He majored his studies in botany and soon after graduating, he combined his creative instinct with his studies. From the 1980s throughout the 1990s, he focused on design and decorating projects for multinationals and large shopping malls throughout the Netherlands and the United States. In the late 1980s he moved to New York City to devote his life to his art.

Works
Van Gestel's works are very diverse and cannot be placed in just one -ism. In 2006 Sotheby's Amsterdam organised an exhibition giving a complete overview of his oeuvre and stated: “His oeuvre is vast and significant…….Harry van Gestel is beyond any -ism” (Mr. Max Hemelraad, art historian and former Business Development director at Sotheby's). 
The works stand for freedom in a broad sense of the word. The artist states: “With every new work I try to surpass myself to a new way to astonish the viewer with composition that is embedded and communicates freedom”.
His works are pure and his creations are not restricted by any conventions whatsoever. The artist describes his works as self-portraits in the sense that the artwork reveals a mirror image of the soul, energy and emotion of the artist at the moment of creation.

None of the artist's works have a title. Van Gestel states that a title for his works, that portray emotion through pureness of soul, does not add anything to the artwork and so only takes away all essential emotional value from the imagination of the spectator.

Shows
In 1981 Harry van Gestel started working on international shows. Throughout the following years, his works were shown in the Netherlands, Mexico, Bahamas, Colombia and the United States. Afterwards, in 1984, he worked on multiple projects in Switzerland. Between 1990 and 1993 he traveled throughout the United States working on a range of art workshops.

In 1992 Van Gestel received a solo show at Gallery Marie Louise Woltering in the well-known Spiegelkwartier in Amsterdam. Between 1995 and 1997 he worked, lived and realized multiple shows in Paris, New York City, Altea, and Mauritius.
From 1998 Van Gestel has had a permanent exhibition in the centre of Amsterdam.
In 2006 Sotheby's Amsterdam featured a solo exhibition, a retrospective overview of his oeuvre. 
In 2007 The Nagasaki Museum of History and Culture in Japan hosted an exhibition of the works of 5 prominent Dutch artists, including the works of Harry van Gestel. 
In 2009 Harry exhibited a range of works and held a presentation in the International Museum of Contemporary Art in Vinhedo, Brazil.

Collections
Since the 1980s the artworks by Harry van Gestel have been collected by art collectors, curators and investors from all over the world. Since the artist is leading an international life style, and due to the large international public visiting the Amsterdam gallery, his works can be found in private collections from Chile, Argentina, Brazil, United States, Canada, Japan, China, Australia, Russia, the Middle East and throughout Europe.

Auctions
From around the start of the millennium the works of Harry van Gestel have been auctioned by Sotheby's Amsterdam multiple times. In 2006 Sotheby's organised a solo exhibition of the works of Harry van Gestel at their location in the centre of Amsterdam.

Gallery
In 1998 Harry van Gestel opened his gallery in the city centre of Amsterdam. Since early 2013 the gallery is directed by Thomas van de Meer, owner of Vault17.
The artist has his studio space in the gallery. The location functions as a spot for international artists to come together and inspire each other. Van Gestel stresses the importance of sharing and collaborating between artists.
"Over the years people from all corners of the globe have visited us and have given us the chance to inspire each other.  A “sharing" factor in many ways has always prevailed in the gallery, sharing your art, energy, thoughts or space”.

Charity
Since 1998 Harry van Gestel is the founder of Foundation Mercurius Communication through Art. The foundation has been supporting Charities and projects internationally through the sales of Van Gestel's work. Since 1998 the foundation has supported Het Babyhuis, Cliniclowns, breast cancer research, Bio revalidatie, AIDS foundation, Kidney foundation, primary schools in Brazil amongst other projects.

References

External links

1953 births
Living people
Dutch painters
Dutch male painters
People from Reusel-De Mierden